Hefer is a surname. Notable people with the surname include:

Bar Hefer (born 1995), Israeli beauty pageant winner
Clyde Hefer (born 1961), Australian rower
Haim Hefer (1925–2012), Polish-born Israeli songwriter, poet, and writer
Joos Hefer (born 1931), South African judge

See also

Hepher